Daw'an District is a district of the Hadhramaut Governorate, Yemen. In 2003, the district had a population of 43,836.

References

Districts of Hadhramaut Governorate